Christianity is a minority religion in the Nigerian State of sokoto, where Sharia is partially  practice (only muslims). The Roman Catholic Diocese of Sokoto has some 44,000 Catholics. 
The Redeemed Christian Church of God is active in Sokoto.
An Anglican Diocese of Sokoto of the Church of Nigeria has been created in about 1990. An ECWA Samuel Matankari Memorial College of the Evangelical Church of West Africa exists in Sokoto. Zion World Prayer and Missions has its headquarters in Sokoto.

See also 

Christianity in Kano State
Christianity in Adamawa State
Christianity in Borno State
Christianity in Jigawa State
Christianity in Kaduna State
Christianity in Katsina State
Christianity in Kebbi State
Christianity in Kwara State
Christianity in Niger State
Christianity in Ogun State
Christianity in Osun State
Christianity in Yobe State

References

Sokoto State
Sokoto